The 1921 Southern Branch Cubs football team represented the Southern Branch of the University of California in the 1921 college football season (later known as UCLA).  The program, which was later known as the Bruins, was in its third year of existence. The Cubs were coached by Harry Trotter and finished the season with a 0–5 record.

Schedule

References

Southern Branch
UCLA Bruins football seasons
College football winless seasons
Southern Branch Cubs football